A veterans' organization, also known as an , is an organization composed of persons who served in a country's armed forces, especially those who served in the armed forces during a period of war. The organization's concerns include benefits for spouses and children, veterans' claims, post-traumatic stress disorder (PTSD) issues, and other topics related to veterans and to their families.

In addition to welfare services, they often participate in community projects and their 'local' or club is often a well-known meeting place or restaurant in a locality.

In France, the charter of the main governmental veterans' organization (ONACVG) has been expanded to include victims of terrorist attacks, following the 2015 attacks.

Notable veterans' organization are The American Legion, Disabled American Veterans (DAV), Veterans of Foreign Wars of the United States (VFW), Returned & Services League of Australia (RSL), and the Memorable Order of Tin Hats.

See also 
 List of veterans' organizations

External links 

 

 
Military-related organizations
org